Satu Nusa Satu Bangsa is an Indonesian national song created by Liberty Manik, and the song was first played via radio broadcasts in 1947. 

This song as a broadcast ending theme was used in closedown on SCTV, Media Group (MetroTV, Magna Channel, BNTV, MG Radio Network), CNBC Indonesia, SEA Today dan GTV.

Lyrics and structure

"Satu Nusa Satu Bangsa" is performed andante moderato in  time.

Indonesian songs
Indonesian patriotic songs